MRAP may refer to

 MRAP, Mine Resistant Ambush Protected vehicle, type of armored fighting vehicle
 MRAP (French NGO), Mouvement contre le racisme et pour l'amitié entre les peuples (Movement Against Racism and for Friendship between Peoples), a French anti-racism NGO
 Melanocortin 2 receptor accessory protein